Juan de Giacomo (born 1913, date of death unknown) was an Argentine sports shooter. He competed in the trap event at the 1952 Summer Olympics.

References

External links
 

1913 births
Year of death missing
Place of birth missing
Argentine male sport shooters
Olympic shooters of Argentina
Shooters at the 1952 Summer Olympics